John "Jack" Gass was an early professional football player. He played mostly with the Latrobe Athletic Association from 1895 until 1899. In 1898, he was a member of the Western Pennsylvania All-Stars, which was a team put together by Latrobe manager Dave Berry for the purpose of challenging the star-filled Duquesne Country and Athletic Club to the first pro football all-star game held at Exposition Park in Pittsburgh. The All-Stars lost to Duquesne, 16–0. In 1897, Gass was a member of the very first all-professional football team, in Latrobe, to play a complete season together. In 1900, he played for Latrobe's rival, the Greensburg Athletic Association.

References

 
 

1898 Western Pennsylvania All-Star football players
Latrobe Athletic Association players
Greensburg Athletic Association players
Lehigh Mountain Hawks football players
19th-century players of American football